The men's 100 metres event at the 2013 Summer Universiade was held on 7–8 July.

Medalists

Results

Heats
Qualification: First 3 in each heat and 5 best performers advanced to the quarterfinals.

Wind:Heat 1: +0.4 m/s, Heat 2: +0.8 m/s, Heat 3: -0.4 m/s, Heat 4: +0.3 m/s, Heat 5: -0.8 m/s, Heat 6: +0.4 m/s, Heat 7: 0.0 m/s, Heat 8: -0.8 m/s, Heat 9: -0.8 m/s

Quarterfinals
Qualification: First 3 in each heat (Q) and the next 4 fastest (q) qualified for the semifinals.

Wind:Heat 1: -0.2 m/s, Heat 2: -0.3 m/s, Heat 3: -0.1 m/s, Heat 4: -0.4 m/s

Semifinals
Qualification: First 4 in each heat (Q) qualified for the final.

Wind:Heat 1: -0.2 m/s, Heat 2: -0.4 m/s

Final
Wind: +0.5 m/s

References 

100
2013